Avisar Sheinmann (born 26 April 1982) is an Israeli judoka.

Achievements

External links
 
 

1982 births
Living people
Israeli male judoka
Place of birth missing (living people)
21st-century Israeli people